The Mall School is an independent preparatory school for boys, in Twickenham, London. The school accommodates pupils in Reception at the age of 4, before leaving for senior schools at the age of 11.

Facilities
The school buildings consist of the main site accommodating pupils from Year 2 through to Year 6, and a separate "Pre-Prep" building, a few minutes' walk from the main site, accommodating pupils in Reception and Year 1.

The facilities at the main site include a 160-seat theatre, a science block and garden, art and music studios, an ICT suite, and library.  Interactive classroom whiteboards are provided throughout most of the school.  An indoor swimming pool and sports hall are on site;  use is also made of rugby and football pitches at St.James' Primary School, and cricket pitches and athletics facilities at Bushy Park.

School structure
In 2017 the school announced it was to phase out the sitting of the Common Entrance examination at age 13 (Year 8) and the two academic years leading up to them. All boys would select their future schools in Year 6 and, if required, sit 11+ entrance exams for them, and then leave at the age of 11. This change was made in order to follow the trend of senior schools preferring to admit the majority of their pupils at that age.  The first 11+ cohort left in the summer of 2019, and the last 13+ cohort in the summer of 2020.

Some pupils may go on to the leading London day schools, including St. Paul's School, Hampton School and King's College School. Others go to a wide range of single-sex and coeducational day schools including Kingston Grammar School, as well as state grammar schools including Tiffin.

Link with Chitsime School (Malawi) 
The Mall School has had a partnership with Chitsime School in Malawi since 2009.

It is the focus of many fundraising activities, and the boys are motivated to help the school in as many ways as practicable. In particular, in recent years pupils and staff at the Mall have raised thousands of pounds to provide brand new classrooms for Chitsime School.

Notable alumni
Zac Goldsmith, former Conservative MP for Richmond Park
Alex Pettyfer, actor - known for his lead role in Magic Mike
Crispian Mills, musician
Noah and the Whale, two members of the band (brothers Charlie and Doug Fink) known for their popular music song 5 Years Time
Andy Beattie, former rugby player, Bath Rugby Club and England national rugby union team
Gareth Stedman Jones, historian

References

External links
 

Preparatory schools in London
Private schools in the London Borough of Richmond upon Thames
Private boys' schools in London
Twickenham